Alf Rolfsen (28 January 1895 – 10 November 1979) was a Norwegian painter and muralist.

Personal life
Rolfsen was born in Kristiania (now Oslo), Norway. He was the son of writer Nordahl Rolfsen (1848-1928) and Hedevig Martha Hastrup Birch (1858–1937). He was married to Ingrid Platou (1893–1980) in 1920. He was a cousin of both poet Nordahl Grieg (1902–1943) and publisher Harald Grieg (1894–1972).

Career
He studied art under Danish artist Peter Rostrup Bøyesen (1882-1952) in Copenhagen from 1913-16. He debuted in Copenhagen in 1916, followed by study in Paris from 1919-20 where he was strongly influenced by André Derain (1880–1954).  After returning home, he held his first solo exhibition at Oslo in 1920. Rolfsen followed with a series of study trips to Italy during 1921-22.

In 1922, he was given the task of painting the foundation wall in the exhibition hall at the new Telegraph Building at Kongens gate 21 in Oslo. The building was completed in 1924 based upon designs by architects Arnstein Arneberg (1882-1961) and Magnus Poulsson (1881-1958).

In 1938, Rolfsen was given the task of decorating three of the walls in the Central Hall of the Oslo City Hall, the site at which the annual Nobel Peace Prize ceremonies have been held since 1990.
The northern wall is covered by the painting titled . The painting on the western wall is titled  in recognition of Oslo's patron saint, Hallvard Vebjørnsson. The decorations of the City Hall were finished and uncovered in 1950.

Rolfsen is best known for his fresco paintings. His principal works include the decoration of crematorium at Vestre gravlund in Oslo from 1932–37 and the Haugesund City Hall from 1952–54. He also decorated a number of churches including Stiklestad Church in Verdal from 1929–30 and Ullensaker Church in Akershus from 1958.

Among Rolfsen's book illustrations are an edition of Asbjørnsen and Moe's fairy tales and later editions of his father's readers. He also wrote books and articles on art and artists.

Rolfsen was decorated Knight of the Swedish Order of the Polar Star in 1937  and Commander of the Royal Norwegian Order of St. Olav in 1955. He received the Prince Eugen Medal in 1951. During 1971, he received both the Arts Council Norway Honorary Award and the St. Hallvard Medal.

References

External links
Alf Rolfsen collection at the National Gallery, Oslo

1895 births
1979 deaths
Artists from Oslo
Writers from Oslo
Muralists
20th-century Norwegian painters
Norwegian male painters
Knights of the Order of the Polar Star
Recipients of the Prince Eugen Medal
Recipients of the St. Olav's Medal
20th-century Norwegian male artists
Norwegian expatriates in Denmark